Herr Nilsen Jazz Club is a jazz club in Oslo, Norway. It is located southeast of the Norwegian National Gallery, just metres north of the Hotel Bristol and Oslo Nye Teater, overlooking the courthouse square. Darwin Porter of Frommer's describes the club as "one of the most congenial spots in Oslo and a personal favorite." It often hosts internationally and nationally famous jazz musicians, with a focus on Dixieland jazz music of New Orleans.

References

External links
Official site

Jazz clubs in Oslo